Dimitrios Zografos  (c.1921 – 2 November 2010) was a Greek water polo player. He competed in the men's tournament at the 1948 Summer Olympics.

References

External links

Year of birth uncertain
2010 deaths
Greek male water polo players
Olympic water polo players of Greece
Water polo players at the 1948 Summer Olympics
Place of birth missing